

Abgar VI was king of Osrhoene from

See also 
 Abgar V
 Abgar VII

Citations

References

Further reading 
 

Kings of Osroene
1st-century Arabs
Year of birth missing
Year of death missing